Çıldır (Husenian; meaning "North"; , Chrdili; meaning "Shadow") is a town in Ardahan Province of Turkey. It is the seat of Çıldır District. Its population is 2,552 (2021).

Names 

Geography

The town was established on a flat area with an average height of 1950 meters, and its villages were located on a partly flat and partly hilly land. Çıldır has a very harsh and cold winter climate, and a warm and rainy summer climate. The average temperature of the coldest month is –30 degrees. The average temperature of the hottest month is +25 degrees.

The town consists of 9 quarters, including Aşıkşenlik and Yıldırımtepe.

References

External links
 local news website

Populated places in Ardahan Province
Towns in Turkey
Çıldır District